KCOS may refer to:

 KCOS (TV), a television station (channel 13, virtual channel 13) licensed to El Paso, Texas, United States
 KCOS-LP, a defunct low-power television station (channel 28) formerly licensed to Phoenix, Arizona, United States
 the ICAO airport code for Colorado Springs Airport in Colorado Springs, Colorado, United States
 "Kirksville College of Osteopathy and Surgery," the name under which A.T. Still University operated from 1926 to 1971.